Adrian Ioviță (born 28 June 1954) is a Romanian-Canadian mathematician, specializing in arithmetic algebraic geometry and p-adic cohomology theories.

Education
Born in Timișoara, Romania, Iovita received in 1978 his undergraduate degree in mathematics from the University of Bucharest. He worked as a researcher at the Institute of Mathematics of the Romanian Academy, obtaining a Ph.D. degree in 1991 from the University of Bucharest with thesis On local classfield theory written under the direction of Nicolae Popescu. He received in 1996 a doctorate in mathematics from Boston University. His doctoral thesis there was supervised by Glenn H. Stevens; the thesis title is p-adic Cohomology of Abelian Varieties.

Career
As a postdoc from 1996 to 1998 in Montreal he was at McGill University and Concordia University. From 1998 to 2003 he was an assistant professor at the University of Washington. Since 2003 he is a full professor at Concordia University. He has held visiting positions at the University of Padua, and also in Paris, Münster, Jerusalem, and Nottingham.

Awards
In 2008 Iovita received the Ribenboim Prize. In 2018 he was an invited speaker, with Vincent Pilloni and Fabrizio Andreatta, with talk p-adic variation of automorphic sheaves (given by Pilloni) at the International Congress of Mathematicians in Rio de Janeiro.

Selected publications

References

20th-century Romanian mathematicians
21st-century Romanian mathematicians
Algebraic geometers
University of Bucharest alumni
Boston University alumni
University of Washington faculty
Academic staff of Concordia University
Living people
Romanian emigrants to Canada
McGill University people
Number theorists
1954 births
Scientists from Timișoara